Be a Brother is the third album by Big Brother and the Holding Company, released in October 1970. It was their first album after Janis Joplin's departure. Recruited in her place were guitarist David Shallock and singer-songwriters Nick Gravenites and Kathi McDonald.

Included are ten original Holding Company compositions; though "Home on the Strange" is credited as "Arranged and adapted by P. Albin and S. Andrew", it is in fact a new composition with no apparent derivation from any public domain work.

Track listing
"Keep On" (Sam Andrew , Peter Albin, David Getz, James Gurley, David Schallock) – 4:21
"Joseph's Coat" (Nick Gravenites, John Cipollina) – 3:10
"Home on the Strange" (Albin, Andrew) – 2:15
"Someday" (Andrew) – 2:17
"Heartache People" (Gravenites) – 6:36
"Sunshine Baby" (Andrew, Albin, Getz, Gurley, Shallock) – 3:30
"Mr. Natural" (Andrew) – 3:31
"Funkie Jim" (Andrew, Albin, Getz, Gurley, Shallock, Gravenites) – 3:47
"I'll Change Your Flat Tire, Merle" (Gravenites) – 3:14
"Be a Brother" (Gravenites) – 3:04

Personnel
Big Brother and the Holding Company
Nick Gravenites – lead (2, 5, 8-10) and backing vocals
Sam Andrew – guitar, lead (1, 4, 6, 7) and backing vocals
David Schallock – guitar, backing vocals
Peter Albin – guitar
James Gurley – bass, guitar
David Getz – drums, piano
with:
Kathi McDonald - Vocals
Richard Greene – violin
Mike Finnigan – keyboard
Tower of Power – horn section
Ira Kamin
Mark Naftalin
Technical
David Brown, Jerry Hochman, Sy Mitchell – engineer
Bob Seidemann – album design, photography
John Van Hamersveld – design concept

Charts

References

Big Brother and the Holding Company albums
1970 albums
Columbia Records albums
Albums produced by Nick Gravenites